A playback singer, also known as a ghost singer, is a singer whose singing is pre-recorded for use in films. Playback singers record songs for soundtracks, and actors or actresses lip-sync the songs for cameras; the actual singer does not appear on the screen.

South Asia
South Asian films produced in the Indian subcontinent frequently use this technique. A majority of Indian films as well as Pakistani films typically include six or seven songs. After Alam Ara (1931), the first Indian talkie film, for many years singers made dual recordings for a film, one during the shoot, and later in the recording studio, until 1952 or 1953. Popular playback singers in India enjoy the same status as popular actors and music directors and receive wide public admiration. Most of the playback singers are initially trained in classical music, but they later often expand their range.

Mohammed Rafi and Ahmed Rushdi are regarded as two of the most influential playback singers in South Asia. The sisters Lata Mangeshkar and Asha Bhosle, who have mainly worked in Hindi films, are two of the best-known and most prolific playback singers in India. In 2011, Guinness officially acknowledged Bhosle as the most recorded artist in music history.

Hollywood
Playback singing is also used in Hollywood musicals though less frequently in other genres. Notable Hollywood performances include Anita Ellis as the voice of Rita Hayworth's title character in Gilda (1946). Both Anita Ellis's and Rita Hayworth's performances were so impressive that audiences did not know that Rita's voice had been dubbed. Called "the sexiest voice of 1946", Ellis's identity was not publicized. Rita Hayworth was instead credited on the soundtrack. 

There have been other uses of playback singing throughout Hollywood, including Marni Nixon in West Side Story for Natalie Wood's portrayal of Maria, in The King and I for Deborah Kerr's Anna Leonowens, and for Audrey Hepburn's Eliza in My Fair Lady; Bill Lee singing for John Kerr's Lieutenant Cable in South Pacific and for Christopher Plummer's Captain von Trapp in The Sound of Music, Lindsay Ridgeway for Ashley Peldon's character as Darla Dimple in the animated film Cats Don't Dance, Claudia Brücken providing the singing voice for Erika Heynatz's character as Elsa Lichtmann in L.A. Noire, and Betty Noyes singing for Debbie Reynolds in Singin' in the Rain, a film in which playback singing is a major plot point.

Examples 

Known playback singers include:

 India Adams, who dubbed for Cyd Charisse in The Band Wagon (1953). That same year, she also dubbed for Joan Crawford in Torch Song.
 Bill Shirley, who dubbed for Jeremy Brett in Warner Bros. My Fair Lady
 Jo Ann Greer, who dubbed for Rita Hayworth, Kim Novak, and Dorothy Malone
 Marni Nixon, who dubbed for Ingrid Bergman in Joan of Arc, Deborah Kerr in The King and I and An Affair To Remember, for Natalie Wood in West Side Story, for Audrey Hepburn in My Fair Lady (1963), and for Marilyn Monroe in Gentlemen Prefer Blondes
 Betty Wand, who dubbed for Leslie Caron in Gigi
 Betty Noyes, who dubbed for Debbie Reynolds in Singin' in the Rain
 Annette Warren, who dubbed for Ava Gardner in Show Boat and Lucille Ball in both Fancy Pants and Sorrowful Jones
 Darlene Love ghost sang for girl group The Crystals, as acknowledged in the documentary 20 Feet From Stardom
 Bill Lee provided the singing voice for Matt Mattox as Caleb Pontipee in Seven Brides for Seven Brothers, John Kerr as Lieutenant Cable in South Pacific and for Christopher Plummer as Captain von Trapp in the film of The Sound of Music
 Thurl Ravenscroft provided the singing voice for Ken Clark as Stewpot in South Pacific and Fred Astaire in Daddy Long Legs
 John Wallace provided the singing voice for Paul L. Smith as Bluto in Popeye
 Diana Coupland provided the singing voice for Ursula Andress in the first official James Bond movie, Dr. No
 Yang Peiyi, who dubbed for Lin Miaoke at the 2008 Olympics opening ceremony in Beijing
 Drew Seeley, an actor, dancer and singer provided the vocals for Zac Efron in the 2006 Disney musical film High School Musical
 Tsin Ting, who is perhaps best known as the Marni Nixon of Hong Kong cinema.
 Andrea Robinson, who provided the vocals for Wendy Makkena in the Sister Act franchise.

See also

 Dubbing, also known as looping or post-sync
 Filmi-ghazal
 Lip sync
 List of Pakistani film singers

References

External links 
 

 
Deception
Occupations in music
Film music